The 2021–22 season was Arbroath's third consecutive season in the Scottish Championship, following their promotion from Scottish League One in the 2018–19 season. They also competed in the Scottish League Cup, Scottish Challenge Cup and the Scottish Cup.

Season summary
In May 2021, the SPFL confirmed the return of the Scottish Challenge Cup after being scrapped for the 2020–21 season however, teams from Wales, Northern Ireland and the Republic of Ireland would not be included to reduce unnecessary travel during the COVID-19 pandemic.

Competitions

Pre-season

Scottish Championship

Premiership play-off

Scottish League Cup

Group stage

Knockout phase

Scottish Challenge Cup

Scottish Cup

League table

League Cup table

Transfers

Transfers in

Transfers out

Loans in

Loans out

Notes

References

Arbroath
Arbroath F.C. seasons